Svetlana Yuryevna Sleptsova (born 31 July 1986 in Khanty Mansiysk) is a retired Russian biathlete. She is a member of the club CSKA (Central Sports Club of the Army). She is a three-time Junior World Champion and won the bronze medal in the mixed relay at the 2008 World Championships in Östersund. In 2009, she was part of the gold medal winning Russian women's relay team at the World Championships in Pyeongchang. Sleptsova is an Olympic champion in relay at Vancouver.

In February 2020, Sleptsova was found guilty of an anti-doping violation and had her results from 2013-14 disqualified she was further identified as being a protected athlete as part of the Russian state doping program by whistleblower Rodchenkov in which he alleges that her positive drug test from an in- competition test result were attributed to another athlete through state intervention.

Career

Sleptsova achieved her first success in 2001, when she won the A. Strepetova prize at the Russian Youth Championships. In 2005 she won the individual competition at the Youth World Championships in Kontiolahti (Finland), 1:15 minutes ahead of Vita Semerenko. She did her World Cup debut at Pokljuka in 2007. She achieved two victories at Martell—in the sprint and pursuit competitions, respectively. At the Senior Russian Championships she won three medals, and received a ticket to the country's main national team.

Sleptsova finished the sprint at Oberhof, Germany as second, and repeated this result in the subsequent week at Ruhpolding. Later, after the disqualification of Kaisa Varis (Finland), she was awarded the victory of this competition. Sleptsova arrived at the 2008 World Championships in Östersund and won the bronze medal in the mixed relay competition. At the end of the season, at Oslo-Holmenkollen, she achieved her first "real" victory, finally standing on top of the pedestal, and won the pursuit competition as well. She came up with similar results at the 2008 Russian Championships, winning three gold medals and the grand prize—a car. As of 2009, she has three world cup victories, excluding the one Varis retrieved after being cleared to compete again after IBU had broken test correction process.

Sleptsova's last competition was the 2017 Summer Biathlon World Championships in Chaykovskiy, Russia. There, she won on all three disciplines (sprint, pursuit and mixed). Following that, Sleptsova announced her retirement on 27 August 2017, to instead focus on family life.

Biathlon results
All results are sourced from the International Biathlon Union.

Olympic Games
 1 medal (1 gold)

* The mixed relay was added as an event in 2014.

World Championships
 2 medals (1 gold, 1 bronze)

* During Olympic seasons competitions are only held for those events not included in the Olympic program.

Junior/Youth World Championships
 6 medals (3 gold, 1 silver, 2 bronze)

Individual podiums
 5 victories – (3 Sp, 2 Pu) 
 16 podiums – (7 Sp, 6 Pu, 2 MS, 1 In) 
 
* Results are from UIPMB and IBU races which include the Biathlon World Cup, Biathlon World Championships and the Winter Olympic Games.

Relay podiums
 6 victories – (6 RL)
 16 podiums – (14 RL, 2 MR)
 
* Results are from UIPMB and IBU races which include the Biathlon World Cup, Biathlon World Championships and the Winter Olympic Games.

Overall record
 

a.  Includes mixed relay and single mixed relay, the event involves one male and one female biathlete each completing two legs consisting of one prone and one standing shoot.
b.  Disqualified (DSQ).

* Statistics as of 8 March 2017.

Shooting

* Results in all IBU World Cup races, Olympics and World Championships including relay events and disqualified races. Statistics as of 8 March 2017.''

References

External links

 
 

Living people
1986 births
Russian female biathletes
People from Khanty-Mansiysk
Biathletes at the 2010 Winter Olympics
Olympic biathletes of Russia
Olympic gold medalists for Russia
Olympic medalists in biathlon
Biathlon World Championships medalists
Medalists at the 2010 Winter Olympics
Sportspeople from Khanty-Mansi Autonomous Okrug